Bediako is both a surname and a given name. Notable people with the name include:

Bediako Asare (born 1930), Ghanaian journalist and writer
Kwabena Bediako (born 1986), African-American chemist 
Kwame Bediako (1945–2008), Ghanaian theologian

Surnames of Akan origin